Jon C. Bingesser is a former American football coach and school administrator.

Coaching career

High school
Bingesser spent many years coaching in Kansas at the high school level.  He was widely recognized by his peers for his coaching abilities in 2007 when he was inducted into the Kansas Shrine Bowl Hall of Fame after having coached the game in 1975 and then again in 1981.

Kansas Wesleyan
Bingesser was the 16th head football coach at Kansas Wesleyan University in Salina, Kansas and he held that position for four seasons, from 1981 until 1984.  His coaching record at Kansas Wesleyan was 13–26–1.

Academic career
After coaching in college, Bingesser entered public school education in Kansas.  In 1994, he was named "Assistant Principal of the Year" by the Kansas Association of Secondary School Principals.

Head coaching record

References

1936 births
Living people
American men's basketball players
Kansas Wesleyan Coyotes football coaches
Washburn Ichabods football players
Washburn Ichabods men's basketball players
High school football coaches in Kansas